Saint-Hymetière-sur-Valouse is a commune in the Jura department in Bourgogne-Franche-Comté in eastern France. It was established on 1 January 2019 by merger of the former communes of Chemilla (the seat), Cézia, Lavans-sur-Valouse and Saint-Hymetière.

See also
Communes of the Jura department

References

Communes of Jura (department)